Portugal has participated in the biennial classical music competition Eurovision Young Musicians 4 times since its debut in 1990 and are yet to receive a top 3 placing in any contest (as of 2014). Portugal hosted the contest in 1996.

Participation overview

Hostings

See also
Portugal in the Eurovision Song Contest
Portugal in the Eurovision Dance Contest
Portugal in the Junior Eurovision Song Contest
Portugal in the Eurovision Young Dancers

References

External links 
 Eurovision Young Musicians

Countries in the Eurovision Young Musicians